77 Armoured Engineer Squadron was a sub-unit of 35 Engineer Regiment.  The sub-unit provides close support engineering to the 1st Battalion, The Princess of Wales's Royal Regiment (Queen's and Royal Hampshires) battlegroup.  It is located in Barker Barracks, Paderborn, Germany.  From October 2011 to May 2012 the sub-unit was deployed on Operation Herrick 15 in Afghanistan.

References

Squadrons of the Royal Engineers